Valerio Scanu (born 10 April 1990, La Maddalena, Sardinia) is an Italian pop rock singer.

In 2008 Scanu took part in the eighth edition of the Italian talent show Amici di Maria De Filippi, in which he ended up in second place.

On 20 February 2010, he won the 60th edition of the televised Italian song contest Sanremo Music Festival with the song "Per tutte le volte che..."

In November 2022 he came out as gay.

Career

Growing up
In 2000 he participated in the Festival "Canzoni sotto l'albero", during this festival he ranked third.

In 2002, Scanu participated in another TV program "Bravo Bravissimo" presented by Mike Bongiorno, and won the first prize.

During the summer months of years 2001–2007, Valerio Scanu performed several times at a piano bar in his hometown entertaining tourists of all nationalities with his voice.

In 2007 Scanu participated in various auditions such as the French version American Idol, Italian version X-Factor, and the musical Giulietta e Romeo by Riccardo Cocciante. He was not selected in any of these auditions. During the same year the took part in the Theatrical representation of the musical Notre Dame de Paris hosted in his hometown, acting the part of the singer 'Gregoire'.

Amici di Maria De Filippi
In 2008, Valerio Scanu participated as a contestant in the 8th edition of the TV talent show Amici di Maria De Filippi, during the final show he ranked second.

In January 2009 SonyBMG Italy released "Scialla", a compilation of the songs sung by the contestants of Amici di Maria De Filippi. In the album two unpublished songs of Valerio Scanu were inserted: "Can't Stop" and "Domani". The album reached rank number one in the Italian charts.

First EP
His first EP Sentimento was released on the day of his 19th birthday, 10 April 2009, in Italy, obtaining the Gold record for the number of sales done (30.000 copies). The album was preceded by the single holding the same name "Sentimento", and leaps immediately to the top of the downloads classification.

On 8 July 2009 a cover version of "Listen" by Beyoncé was digitally released. During the same period he was nominated and received winning a trophy at Wind Music Awards 2009 for the sales done for Sentimento.

First album
In October 2009, with close collaboration with producer Charlie Rapino, Scanu published his eponymous album, Valerio Scanu, which debuted at rank position four in the classification for sales exceeding targets for a Gold Record. Two months later there was a re-issue of this album entitled Valerio Scanu-Christmas Edition, containing an addition of four unpublished track. "Ricordati di noi" was the first single to be released which preceded the release of this album.

Winner of Sanremo Music Festival
In February 2010, Scanu became the winner of the 60th edition of the Sanremo Music Festival with his song "Per tutte le volte che", written by Pierdavide Carone. Scanu was initially eliminated after the second round of voting; however as a result of the number of televotes received, he was "saved" on the third evening of the contest, thus remaining a contestant and eventually ending up in the first place on the podium.

Second album
On 19 February 2010, Per tutte le volte che was released, which album contained nine tracks recorded between Italy and London, winning the Gold Record for the number of sales obtained (30.000 copies). Meanwhile, the single "Per tutte le volte che" obtained the Digital Download Platinum Record with over 30,000 downloads. From the album two more singles were later extracted and published, "Credi in me" and "Indissolubile."

Third album
On 9 November 2010, the third album Parto Da Qui was published. The album was preceded by the single "Mio", which arrived eighth in the FIMI chart. Parto Da Qui reached the second position of the most sold albums in Italy.
The second single was "L'amore cambia" which single had a videoclip released as a Fan Version. Six months later, in April 2011, Parto da qui – Tour Edition was published, and arrived sixth in the FIMI chart. It was preceded by the single "Due stelle". This re-issued contained an additional DVD with videoclips from the "Love Show".

Fourth album
On 20 March 2012, Cosi Diverso was published, which album was anticipated by the single "Amami". A few months later the second single was extracted and published, "Libera mente".

Discography

EPs
2009 – Sentimento (10 April 2009) (ITA  3: Gold, 30.000+ copies)
2010 – Per tutte le volte che... (16 April 2010)

Albums
2009 – Valerio Scanu (16 October 2009) (ITA No. 4; Gold – 30,000+ copies)
2010 – Per tutte le volte che... (19 February 2010) (ITA No. 2; Gold – 30,000+ copies
2010 – Parto da qui (9 November 2010)  (ITA No. 2; Gold – 30,000+ copies)
2012 – Così diverso (20 March 2012)  (ITA No. 6)
2014 – Lasciami entrare (28 January 2014) (ITA No. 2)

Live albums
2013 – Valerio Scanu Live in Roma (11 June 2013) (ITA No. 21)

Singles
2009 – Sentimento (No. 1 ITA)
2009 – Dopo di Me (No. 9 ITA)
2009 – Listen
2009 – Ricordati di noi (No. 8 ITA)
2009 – Polvere di stelle
2010 – Per tutte le volte che... (No. 1 ITA, Platinum; No. 30 CH)
2010 – Credi in me
2010 – Indissolubile
2010 – Mio (No. 8 ITA)
2011 – L'amore cambia
2011 – Due stelle
2012 – Amami
2012 – Libera mente
2014 – Sui nostri passi (No. 12 ITA)
2014 – Lasciami entrare (No. 4 ITA, Gold)
2014 – Parole di cristallo (No. 2 ITA, Gold)

Awards and nominations

References

External links
 Official website

1990 births
Living people
Italian pop singers
Italian operatic baritones
English-language singers from Italy
People from the Province of Sassari
Sanremo Music Festival winners
Music in Sardinia
Italian male singer-songwriters
Gay singers
Gay songwriters
Italian gay musicians
Italian LGBT singers
Italian LGBT songwriters
20th-century Italian LGBT people
21st-century Italian LGBT people